Matthias Friedemann (born 17 August 1984 in Rochlitz) is a German cyclist.

Palmares
2007
2nd Grote Prijs Stad Zottegem
2008
1st stage 4 Vuelta a Cuba
3rd Grand Prix de la Ville de Lillers
2009
1st stage 1 Course de la Solidarité Olympique

References

1984 births
Living people
German male cyclists
People from Rochlitz
Cyclists from Saxony